The Tourism Bureau, MOTC is the government agency under the Ministry of Transportation and Communications of Taiwan (Republic of China) responsible for the administration of domestic and international tourism policy making, execution and development in Taiwan.

History
The development of tourism industry in Taiwan within the government level began in 1956. In September 1960, a Committee of Tourism was set up within the Ministry of Transportation and Communications with the approval from Executive Yuan. In October 1966, the committee was reorganized as the Tourism Council. On 29 December 1972, the council was finally changed to Tourism Bureau.

Organizational structures
 Planning and Research Division
 Hotel, Travel and Training Division
 Technical Division
 International Affairs Division
 Domestic Tourism Division
 Secretariat
 Personnel Department
 Anti-corruption Department
 Accounting Department

Service centers
 Taipei
 Taiwan Taoyuan International Airport, Taoyuan
 Kaohsiung International Airport, Kaohsiung
 Tourism Bureau, New York branch office (established in 1978)

Transportation
The building is accessible within walking distance West from Sun Yat-sen Memorial Hall Station of the Taipei Metro.

See also
 Ministry of Transportation and Communications (Taiwan)
 List of tourist attractions in Taiwan
 Tourism in Taiwan
 Taiwan Tour Bus 台灣觀光巴士

References

External links

 

1960 establishments in Taiwan
Executive Yuan
Government agencies established in 1960
Tourism agencies